Raúl Bercovich Rodriguez (1 January 1922 – 6 May 1993) was Federal Interventor of Córdoba, Argentina from September 20, 1975 to March 24, 1976. He was a member of the Peronist right-wing unionist tendency, rival to Ricardo Obregón Cano.

References
El Navarrazo y el gobierno de Obregón Cano: 1973-74, R. A. Ferrero, 1995
Tensiones y conflictos en el reordenamiento sindical de la transición democrática en Córdoba, G. Closa, 2005
Crisis, renovación partidaria y transformaciones políticas en el peronismo de Córdoba, 1983-1987, Centro de Estudios Avanzados - UNC
Y fué en Córdoba--, Efraín U. Bischoff, 1997

1922 births
1993 deaths
Governors of Córdoba Province, Argentina